The Muy River is a tributary of the east bank of the Wetetnagami River flowing into the Regional County Municipality (RCM) of Eeyou Istchee James Bay, in the administrative region of Nord-du-Québec, Quebec, Canada.

This river crosses successively (from the upstream) the townships of Prévert, Muy and Effiat.

Forestry is the main economic activity of the sector; recreational tourism activities, second.

The Muy River Valley is served by R1015 Forest Road (North-South) passing west of the Wetetnagami River Valley; this road joins the road R1051 towards the North (East-West direction). Route R1053 (East-West) intersects the lower part of the Muy River.

The surface of the Muy River is usually frozen from early November to mid-May, however, safe ice movement is generally from mid-November to mid-April.

Geography

Toponymy 
At various times in history, this territory has been occupied by the Attikameks, the Algonquin and the Cree. The term "Muy" is a family name of French origin.

The toponym "rivière Muy" was officialized on December 5, 1968, at the Commission de toponymie du Québec, when it was created.

Notes and references

See also 

Rivers of Nord-du-Québec
Jamésie
Nottaway River drainage basin